Doris Hofmann (born 1990) is an Austrian beauty queen designated as Miss Universe Austria 2013. She represented her country at Miss Universe 2013.

Miss Austria 2013
Doris placed as the 1st Runner-up at the Miss Austria 2013.

Designated
Doris Hofmann was selected to represent Austria at the Miss Universe 2013, held in Moscow, Russia on 9 November where she failed to place in Top 16. Doris was a first runner-up in Miss Österreich 2013 pageant.

References

External links
Official website

1990 births
Living people
Miss Universe 2013 contestants
Austrian beauty pageant winners
Austrian female models